Gli equivoci (The Misunderstandings), is an Italian opera buffa by Stephen Storace to a libretto by Lorenzo Da Ponte, based on Shakespeare's The Comedy of Errors.

Following the success of his libretto for The Marriage of Figaro, Da Ponte was asked by Storace to provide for him a libretto based on Shakespeare. Da Ponte compressed Shakespeare's plot into two acts, but retained nearly all the key elements. Gli equivoci was the second of Storace's operas to be performed at the Burgtheater.

Storace composed the opera following the success of his opera Gli sposi malcontenti in the previous year.

Storace reused some of the music of Gli equivoci in his English operas, including No Song, No Supper and The Pirates.

Performance history
The opera was first performed on 27 December 1786 in the Burgtheater, Vienna.

Roles

References

External links

Stephen Storace: The Comedy of Errors (Gli equivoci), performance details (2000, 2001), synopsis, Bampton Classical Opera

Operas
Operas by Stephen Storace
Opera world premieres at the Burgtheater
Opera buffa
1786 operas
Italian-language operas
Operas based on works by William Shakespeare
Works based on The Comedy of Errors